The Marianna Brown Dietrich College of Humanities and Social Sciences (Dietrich College) is the liberal and professional studies college and the second-largest academic unit by enrollment (after the Carnegie Mellon College of Engineering) at Carnegie Mellon University in Pittsburgh, Pennsylvania, USA. The college emphasizes study through rigorous analysis and technology of the behaviors, institutions, and beliefs that constitute the human experience, describing itself as “not an ordinary liberal arts school.” The college was named for Marianna Brown Dietrich, the mother of philanthropist William S. Dietrich II, after his donation of $265 million to the university in 2011 – the largest single donation in Carnegie Mellon history.

The Dietrich College offers more than 60 majors and minors through its academic departments and specialized degree programs. It is committed to a balance among humanistic, scientific, and professional orientations, and to an emphasis on integrating research experience into undergraduate education. The Dietrich College General Education Program combines required courses that teach key analytical skills with a wide range of elective courses to develop foundational skills essential to effective learning throughout the college career and beyond.

About the Dietrich College

The College of Humanities and Social Sciences admitted its first freshman class in 1969, following the announcement of the pending closure of the Margaret Morrison Carnegie College, although roots of the college can be traced to the Division of Applied Psychology, founded in 1915 and led by Walter Van Dyke Bingham and Walter Dill Scott as the first research-oriented department within Carnegie Mellon. The administrative offices of the Dietrich College are located in Baker Hall. Most of the classes offered by the Dietrich College are held in Baker Hall and Porter Hall, but some classes, particularly the smaller recitation classes, are held in various locations throughout the campus. All undergraduate students at Carnegie Mellon are required to take several Dietrich classes (at least two, but usually more) as part of their program's General Education requirements. Dietrich College's general education program has been called "the most creative general education program of any American university" by The New York Times. The founding Dean of the Dietrich College was Erwin Steinberg. Past deans include John Patrick Crecine, Stephen Fienberg, Joel A. Tarr, Peter Stearns, and John P. Lehoczky. The current Dean is Professor of Philosophy Richard Scheines, who began his term on July 1, 2014. In December 2014, the Andrew W. Mellon Foundation awarded the Dietrich College a $2 million grant to develop training in digital humanities for Ph.D. students in the departments of English, History, Philosophy, and Modern Languages.

On September 7, 2011, William S. Dietrich II, the former chairman of Dietrich Industries, Inc., a subsidiary of Worthington Industries, Inc., pledged a gift of $265 million. In response to this gift, Carnegie Mellon renamed the College of Humanities and Social Sciences to the Marianna Brown Dietrich College of Humanities and Social Sciences after William Dietrich's mother.

Departments and programs

Dietrich College manages seven departments, one institute, one center, and four interdisciplinary programs.

Department of English
Department of History
Department of Modern Languages
Department of Philosophy
Department of Psychology
Department of Social and Decision Sciences
Department of Statistics & Data Science
Institute for Politics and Strategy
Neuroscience Institute (jointly with the Mellon College of Science)
Economics Program (jointly with the Tepper School of Business)
Information Systems Program (jointly with the Heinz College)
Humanities Scholars Program
Quantitative Social Science Scholars Program

Areas of study
Undergraduates can earn a Bachelor of Arts or Bachelor of Science in the following fields of study. Additional majors and minors are available in most fields as well. Graduate programs at the master's and doctorate levels are also available through the college. 

In addition, undergraduate students can define their own major through consultation with their academic advisor.

Jointly administered undergraduate degree programs
The Dietrich College jointly administers the Bachelor of Humanities and Arts (BHA) and Science and Humanities Scholars (SHS) degree programs with the College of Fine Arts and the Mellon College of Science, respectively.

Pre-professional advising
The office of Carnegie Mellon's Pre-law Advising Program is located in the Dietrich College Academic Advisory Center in Baker Hall. Because it is a university program, all interested undergraduate students of the university are welcome to make use of the services offered by the program. Similarly, all interested students of the university, not just science students, can meet with the advisor for the Health Professions Program, located in Doherty Hall.

Rankings
Several of the Dietrich College's graduate programs have been ranked in national and international surveys. U.S. News & World Report national rankings for graduate programs place the college's program in economics at 20th, English 51st, history 44th, statistics 8th, and psychology 17th. The graduate program in cognitive psychology is especially highly ranked at 5th in the country.

The 2020 Times Higher Education Supplement world university rankings placed Dietrich College at 55th in social sciences and 60th for arts and humanities.

A 2014 ranking of the top earning average starting salaries for liberal arts graduates ranked the Dietrich College at first place with an average salary of $60,723.

Research
The Dietrich College has particular strengths in the interdisciplinary fields of cognitive science, decision science, logic, rational choice, technical writing, history and policy, and cognitive neuroscience and manages the following interdisciplinary research centers, some of which are linked to other Carnegie Mellon colleges or the University of Pittsburgh:

References

External links
Dietrich College of Humanities and Social Sciences

Schools and departments of Carnegie Mellon
Educational institutions established in 1969
Liberal arts colleges at universities in the United States
1969 establishments in Pennsylvania